DYNN (97.3 FM), broadcasting as 97.3 Radyo Kasugbong, is a radio station owned and operated by the National Nutrition Council under the Nutriskwela Community Radio network. The station's studio is located at the Catubig Municipal Building, Catubig, Northern Samar. "Kasugbong" stands for friend in Waray.

References

Radio stations established in 2011
Radio stations in Northern Samar